"Be Near Me" is a song by English new wave and synth-pop band ABC. It was released in April 1985 as the second single from their third studio album, How to Be a ... Zillionaire! It peaked at No. 26 on the UK Singles Chart in 1985, and was the only single from the album to reach the UK top 40. It was more successful in the United States where it reached No. 9 on the Billboard Hot 100. The song also went to number-one on the U.S. Hot Dance Club Play chart in September of that year, remaining on top for two weeks.

Composition
The song is written in F major (C mixolydian mode) with a BPM of 125.

Music video
The song's music video was directed by Peter Care and shows the four band members in colourful attire playing toy instruments, against a white background and floor while the camera makes a series of rolling, panning and swooping shots.

Track listing

7" version
US release
"Be Near Me" – 3:38
"A to Z" – 2:50

UK release
"Be Near Me" – 3:38
"A to Z" – 2:50

12" version
US release
"Be Near Me" (Munich Disco Mix) – 5:28
"Be Near Me" (Ecstasy Mix) – 4:45
"What's Your Destination?" (instrumental version of "Be Near Me") – 3:36

UK release
"Be Near Me" (Munich Disco Mix) – 5:27
"A to Z" – 2:50
"What's Your Destination?" (instrumental version of "Be Near Me") – 3:38

Chart performance

Weekly charts

Year-end charts

See also
List of Billboard number-one Dance Club songs

References

ABC (band) songs
1985 singles
Songs written by Martin Fry
Songs written by Mark White (musician)
1985 songs
Mercury Records singles